Between 1974 and 1989, the West Midlands Police force operated the West Midlands Serious Crime Squad. It was disbanded after allegations of endemic misconduct, leading to a series of unsafe convictions. These included allegations that officers had falsified confessions in witness statements, denied suspects access to solicitors and used torture such as "plastic bagging" to partially suffocate suspects in order to extract confessions. They were alleged to have abused payments to informers. A series of around 40 prosecutions failed in the late 1980s as defendants showed that evidence had or may have been tampered with. West Yorkshire Police led an investigation which led to a small number of internal disciplinary proceedings, but did not recommend any prosecutions for lack of evidence. However, over 60 convictions secured from their investigations have now been quashed, including those of the Birmingham Six and Bridgewater Four. The failed prosecutions and overturned convictions are listed here in two separate tables.

List of failed prosecutions

Table derived from

List of convictions quashed at appeal
Below are the names of those whose trials were re-examined after their investigations by the West Midlands Serious Crime Squad and subsequent convictions were thought to be potentially unsound. Also included is the later case of Lloyd George Fraser, involving former officers of the squad, where the conviction was quashed because of their involvement. Three others had their convictions quashed in 1985, before the allegations of systemic misconduct were widely accepted (see Tarlochan Singh Gill).

List derived from

List of overturned convictions from the Regional Crime Squad

See also
 West Midlands Serious Crime Squad
 List of miscarriage of justice cases in the United Kingdom

References

Sources

News articles

Judgments

Parliament

Reports

Books

Journal articles

Video and television

Other

Police units of the United Kingdom
Overturned convictions in England
Crime in the West Midlands (county)